Pedro Pablo Treviño Villarreal (born 13 June 1972 in Monterrey, Nuevo León) is a Mexican lawyer and politician who served as state secretary of Labor in Nuevo León from 2010 until 2012. federal deputy for the 2012–2015 period by Nuevo León's 12th Federal District and Chairman of the Committee on Budget and Public Accounts in the 62nd Legislature of the Mexican Congress. Managing Director of Lotería Nacional para la Asistencia Pública and Pronósticos para la Asistencia Pública until September, 2017. Currently, he is President of PRI's State Steering Committee in Nuevo León.

Education and personal life 

Has a Law and Social Sciences Degree by Autonomous University of Nuevo León. In 2001, he got his master's degree in Public Administration by the University of Colorado and in 2002 got his Masters in International Law at the University of Denver. He also has several Diplomas in Public Administration's Management Function by the Mexico Autonomous Institute of Technology in Mexico City; and Business Management by the Rice University in Houston, Texas.
In 2005, he was granted a scholarship by the United States Embassy in Mexico for the North American Competitiveness and Asian Challenge Diploma at the Institute of the Americas in California; that same year he attended “The Challenges of the future of Mexico: Leadership and Performance Strategies” Diploma at Harvard University’s John F. Kennedy School of Government in Massachusetts.

Partisan activity 

In 1990, he joined the Institutional Revolutionary Party where he served as Leader, Coordinator and Political Training Secretary in Municipal Committees of the Popular Revolutionary Youth, the youth organization of the National Confederation of Popular Organizations (CNOP in Spanish).

He has twice been nominated by the Institutional Revolutionary Party for public election, first in 2006 when he sought to be Federal Deputy by Nuevo León’s 6th Federal District, and the second in the 2012’s federal elections when he ran for Federal Deputy nominated by the "Compromiso por Mexico" coalition, made up of the Institutional Revolutionary Party and the Ecologist Green Party, by Nuevo León's 12th Federal District.

In 2003, he served as Technical Secretary of the Social Development Council of then candidate and future governor José Natividad González Parás’ campaign. Also, in 2009 he was Institutional Relations Coordinator of candidate and ex state Governor, Rodrigo Medina de la Cruz.

Professional career

Private sector 

In the private sector he has developed as Legal Adviser in Quintero & Quintero Attorneys, Assistant Financial Vice-president at Bancomer Transfer Services, Transactions Lawyer in Mexico and Latinamerica in Holland & Hart and International Lawyer of Vitro Corporation.

Public Administration 

Within the public sector he was the Secretary of the General Director of the National Lottery for the Public Assistance from 1996 to 1997, Deputy Minister of Trade and Industry of Nuevo León's state from 2003 to 2006 and General Director of the Corporation for the Development of Nuevo León's Borderland in Nuevo León's state government from 2006 until 2009.

On July 20, 2010, the Governor, Rodrigo Medina de la Cruz appointed him Minister of Labor of the state government of Nuevo León, where he served until February 2012.

Elected Office

LXII Legislature of the Mexican Congress 

In the 2012 federal elections he was elected Federal Deputy by the 12th Federal District of Nuevo León so on July 6 of that same year he received the Electoral Federal Institute's record of majority that accredits him as Elected Federal Deputy by having obtained 126 thousand 069 votes (46.01% of the votes cast), and which makes him the Federal Deputy candidate with the highest number of votes received nationally.

On August 29, he was sworn as Federal Deputy of the LXII Legislature of the Mexican Congress. He has served as the Chairman of the Committee on Budget and Public Account, and as a member of the Northern Border Affairs, Competitiveness, and Special Exportation Manufacturing Industry committees. Additionally, he was vice president of the Group of Friendship Mexico - France and member of the Group of Friendship Mexico - Japan.

References 

Politicians from Monterrey
Institutional Revolutionary Party politicians
Members of the Chamber of Deputies (Mexico) for Nuevo León
Living people
1972 births
Lawyers from Nuevo León
21st-century Mexican politicians
Deputies of the LXII Legislature of Mexico